Cho Young-wook (born 5 February 1999) is a South Korean footballer who plays as a forward for Gimcheon Sangmu and the South Korea national team.

Club career 
Cho joined FC Seoul in January 2018.

He made his K League 1 debut against Jeju United on 1 March 2018.

International career

2017 FIFA U-20 World Cup 
Cho was squad of South Korea national under-20 football team at 2017 FIFA U-20 World Cup.

2019 FIFA U-20 World Cup 
Cho Young-wook participated in the U-20 tournament for the second time since the FIFA U-20 World Cup two years ago. In the last tournament, Cho Young-wook failed to score a goal despite being a striker, but he scored second goal of the tournament against Argentina.

Club career statistics

International goals 
Scores and results list South Korea's goal tally first.

Honours

International
South Korea U14
Asian Youth Games: 2013

South Korea U20
FIFA U-20 World Cup runner-up: 2019
AFC U-19 Championship runner-up: 2018

South Korea U23
AFC U-23 Championship: 2020

Individual
Korean Young Footballer of the Year: 2016

References

External links
 
 Cho Young-wook – National Team stats at KFA 
 

1999 births
Living people
Association football forwards
South Korean footballers
FC Seoul players
K League 1 players
Korea University alumni
Footballers from Seoul
South Korea under-20 international footballers